Philip James Jones, FBA, FRHistS (19 November 1921 – 26 March 2006) was a British medieval historian, known for his work on medieval and Renaissance Italy.

Born in London, Jones was educated at St Dunstan's College and Wadham College, Oxford, and Magdalen College, Oxford. He was assistant lecturer at the University of Glasgow from 1949 to 1950, lecturer at the University of Leeds from 1950 to 1961, reader at Leeds from 1961 to 1963, and fellow and tutor at Brasenose College, Oxford from 1963 until his retirement.

References 

 https://www.independent.co.uk/news/obituaries/philip-jones-6101989.html
 https://www.ukwhoswho.com/view/10.1093/ww/9780199540891.001.0001/ww-9780199540884-e-22447
https://www.oxforddnb.com/view/10.1093/ref:odnb/9780198614128.001.0001/odnb-9780198614128-e-97198

1921 births
2006 deaths
British medievalists
Historians of Italy
People educated at St Dunstan's College
Alumni of Wadham College, Oxford
Alumni of Magdalen College, Oxford
People from Peckham
Fellows of the British Academy
Fellows of the Royal Historical Society
Academics of the University of Glasgow
Academics of the University of Leeds
Fellows of Brasenose College, Oxford
Economic historians
Historians of the Renaissance
British Army personnel of World War II